Mordellistenula perrisi is a beetle in the genus Mordellistenula of the family Mordellidae. It was described in 1857 by Étienne Mulsant.

References

Mordellidae
Beetles described in 1857